Kala Academy (Academy of the Arts) is a prominent cultural centre run by the Government of Goa, in Goa, India. Situated at Campal, Panjim, it is registered as a society, and was started in February 1970. The building was designed by Charles Correa. It plays the role of being an "apex body to develop music, dance, drama, fine art, folk art, literature, etc. and thereby promote (the) cultural unity of Goa."

Funded by the Government of Goa, the centre offers training through its faculty, and also organises festivals, competitions, exhibitions, workshops, seminars, and other programmes related to various forms of the local arts. It has a General Council of 28 members, a 14-member Executive Board, and advisory committees for various sections. In August 29, the government of Goa siad the structure could not be repaired or renovated and might have to be demolished.

Gallery

References

External links

Kala Academy site

Culture of Goa
Organisations based in Panaji
Buildings and structures in Panaji
Cultural organisations based in India
Arts organizations established in 1970
State agencies of Goa
1970 establishments in Goa, Daman and Diu
Drama schools in India